John Touprest or Towprest (fl. 1394) of Bath, Somerset, was an English politician.

He was a Member (MP) of the Parliament of England for Bath in 1394.

References

Year of birth missing
Year of death missing
English MPs 1394
People from Bath, Somerset